Alchemilla obtusa is a species of flowering plant belonging to the family Rosaceae.

Its native range is Central and Southeastern Europe to Western Siberia and Central Asia.

References

obtusa